6/7 may refer to:
June 7 (month-day date notation)
July 6 (day-month date notation)
6/7 (number), a fraction